There have been sixteen presidents of the Metropolitan Museum of Art:

References

External links
THE MET Leadership

Metropolitan Museum of Art